Keith Forsey (born 2 January 1948) is an English pop musician and record producer.

Early life
Forsey began his career as a percussionist in the mid-late 1960s as the drummer for The Spectrum and as the drummer in Udo Lindenberg's Panik Orchester until 1976, during which he also played percussion for Amon Düül II.  By late 1970s, he was a pioneer of disco, working with artists such as Lipstique, Claudja Barry, La Bionda, the Italo Disco Inventors and Boney M. He became Giorgio Moroder's drummer and played on records by Donna Summer, including Bad Girls, and Sparks' "No. 1 in Heaven." However Forsey's own band, Trax, a collaboration with Pete Bellotte, was not as popular. Forsey was influenced by Moroder and began experimenting with electronics and European dance rhythms.

Production career
Like Moroder, Forsey started producing albums himself, and in 1982 produced Billy Idol's solo debut album, Billy Idol and Icehouse's global breakthrough album Primitive Man. Idol's 1983 follow-up, Rebel Yell, went even further, combining Forsey's affection for synthesized pop, Idol's punk grit, and guitarist Steve Stevens' heavy metal sound. 1983 was the year that established Forsey as a producer. He co-wrote "Flashdance... What a Feeling" with Moroder and Irene Cara, who sang the track, for the movie Flashdance. In 1984, the song earned an Academy Award. The popularity of Flashdance led to his co-writing songs featured on the soundtracks of Ghostbusters, Beverly Hills Cop, The NeverEnding Story and The Breakfast Club. The 1985 hit "Don't You (Forget About Me)" from The Breakfast Club was originally offered to Simple Minds, who declined. But after Bryan Ferry, Billy Idol and several other artists passed on the song, Simple Minds reconsidered; their recording went on to top the charts in several countries.

In 1986, Forsey produced the debut album of young prodigy, Charlie Sexton.

In 2003, Forsey produced the American guitar pop band Rooney. 2005 saw his return to Billy Idol, producing Devil's Playground.

References

External links
 
 
 Official website

1948 births
Living people
Best Original Song Academy Award-winning songwriters
Musicians from London
Golden Globe Award-winning musicians
Grammy Award winners
English record producers
English songwriters
English session musicians
British male drummers
English rock drummers
English expatriates in Germany
British male songwriters